Prior to its uniform adoption of proportional representation in 1999, the United Kingdom used first-past-the-post for the European elections in England, Scotland and Wales. The European Parliament constituencies used under that system were smaller than the later regional constituencies and only had one Member of the European Parliament each.

The constituency of Peak District was one of them.

It was named after the Peak District in the East Midlands and consisted of the Westminster Parliament constituencies (on their 1983 boundaries) of Amber Valley, Ashfield, Broxtowe, Erewash, High Peak, Staffordshire Moorlands, and West Derbyshire.

Arlene McCarthy of the Labour Party was this seat's only MEP.

MEPs

Election results

References

External links
 David Boothroyd's United Kingdom Election Results 

European Parliament constituencies in England (1979–1999)
Politics of Derbyshire
Politics of Staffordshire
Politics of Nottinghamshire
1994 establishments in England
1999 disestablishments in England
Constituencies established in 1994
Constituencies disestablished in 1999